Chromium(III) acetate, commonly known as basic chromium acetate, describes a family of salts where the cation has the formula [Cr3O(O2CCH3)6(OH2)3]+.  The trichromium cation is encountered with a variety of anions, such as chloride and nitrate.  Data in the table above are for the chloride hexahydrate, [Cr3O(O2CCH3)6(OH2)3]Cl(H2O)6.

Salts of basic chromium acetate has long attracted interest because of its distinctive structure, which features octahedral Cr(III) centers, a triply bridging oxo ligand, six acetate ligands, and three aquo ligands.  The same structure is shared with basic iron acetate and basic manganese acetate.  Little evidence exists for a simple chromium(III) acetate, i.e. lacking the oxo ligand. Chromium(III) acetate is a blue/grey-green powder, which is soluble in water.  It is still prepared according to the original procedure from 1909.

See also
 Chromium acetate hydroxide 
 Chromium(II) acetate

References 

Chromium(III) compounds
Acetates
Chromium–oxygen compounds